The 1992 Fresno State Bulldogs football team represented California State University, Fresno, as a member of the Western Athletic Conference (WAC) during the 1992 NCAA Division I-A football season. This was the team's first year in the WAC, after spending the previous 23 seasons in the Big West Conference. Led by 15th-year head coach Jim Sweeney, Fresno State compiled an overall record of 9–4 with a mark of 6–2 in conference play, sharing the WAC title with BYU and Hawaii. The Bulldogs played their home games at Bulldog Stadium in Fresno, California.

Fresno State was invited to the Freedom Bowl, where they beat USC, 24–7. The Bulldogs finished the season ranked No. 24 in the AP Poll and No. 22 in the Coaches Poll.

Schedule

Roster

Team players in the NFL
The following were selected in the 1993 NFL Draft.

The following finished their college career in 1992, were not drafted, but played in the NFL.

References

Fresno State
Fresno State Bulldogs football seasons
Western Athletic Conference football champion seasons
Freedom Bowl champion seasons
Fresno State Bulldogs football